"" ("A beautiful story") is a French song written by Michel Fugain (music) and Pierre Delanoë (lyrics). Featured on the 1972 album , it was released as a single that same year, selling over 800,000 copies and topping the charts in France.

The lyrics, telling of a brief encounter between two young strangers ("they hid in a large wheat field and let the currents carry them away"), were considered risqué at the time. Fugain initially imagined the action to take place along U.S. Route 66, but Delanoë relocated the story in France.

"" has been covered in a variety of languages. In 1972, Franco Califano wrote an Italian version of the song named "" ("One summer ago"), which was first released as a single by the band Homo Sapiens. In 1973, it was recorded in Dutch as "" ("Like a beautiful story") by Ann Christy and in Turkish as "" ("Who set the lovers apart?") by Tanju Okan, Nilüfer and the Modern Folk Üçlüsü.  In 1974, It was recorded in English as "One Lovely Day" by Jay & The October Cherries. In 1978, Japanese chorus group Circus (サーカス) covered this song as Mr. Summer Time (Mr.サマータイム) and topped in Japan.

References 

1972 singles
French songs
Number-one singles in France
Songs written by Pierre Delanoë
1972 songs